NGC 393 is a lenticular galaxy located in the constellation Andromeda. It was discovered on October 5, 1784 by William Herschel. It was described by Dreyer as "faint, very small, very little extended, gradually brighter middle, four small (faint) stars near."

References

0393
00707
+06-03-015
04061
17841005
Andromeda (constellation)
Lenticular galaxies